WIHW-LP (96.1 FM) is a radio station licensed to serve Dover, Delaware.  The station is owned by Capitol Baptist Church.  It airs a Religious radio format featuring programming from the Fundamental Broadcast Network.

Other programming on WIHW-LP includes the Revival Time Radio Broadcast hosted by Dr. Jack Trieber and 
Truth For Teens, a Christian ministry for troubled teens.

The station was assigned the WIHW-LP call letters by the Federal Communications Commission on April 10, 2004.

References

External links
Capitol Baptist Church of Dover
WIHW-LP coverage map
Fundamental Broadcasting Network official website
 

IHW-LP
IHW-LP
Radio stations established in 2005